Jovan Atanacković (24 March 1848 – 9 August 1921) was a Serbian general and Minister of Defence.

Life
Born in Negotin, he finished gymnasium in his home town, after which he entered the Serbian Military Academy in Belgrade. Jovan entered the army service as a cadet of the 7th Artillery School on 9 October 1865. He was ranked third in his class when he finished his education in 1870, and then he was made the 1st artillery lieutenant.

After he finished the Artillery School he was first made sergeant of the 1st field battery of the Standing Army, on 7 January 1871; he was then made registrar in the Artillery Inspection. From April 1872 he was a commander of the people's battery of Ćuprija, and from 8 April 1874, he was made sergeant in the 1st Artillery Regiment of the Standing Army. He was made commander of the 1st Mountain Battery on 15 April 1875. He was made commander of the 2nd Heavy Battery of Timok Valley on 17 April 1876, with which he participated in the First Serbian-Turkish War in 1876/77. He became chief of staff of the Krajina Army on 10 June 1877. After three months, on 9 September, he was appointed chief of staff of Drina Corps and he remained on that function during operations in the Second Serbian-Turkish War. He became chief of staff of Drina Division on 5 October 1878 and after a year, on 23 October 1879, he was transferred to the General Staff Division and attached to the Office of Prince Milan Obrenović.

On 1 April 1880 Jovan was appointed acting Chief of Staff of the Artillery Brigade until 30 October 1882, when he became Chief of Staff of the Active Army Command. On 15 February 1883, he was appointed commander of the 11th Battalion of the Standing Army, and on 12 October that year he was named acting commander of the Šumadija Standing Infantry Regiment. He became Chief of Operative Division of the Staff of the Supreme Command on 2 November 1885. While there he participated in the war against Bulgaria in 1885. He was named Chief of Staff of the Danube Division Area on 1 March 1886. Afterwards, he returned to the Šumadija Standing Infantry Regiment on 30 April 1888 but this time as commander.

On 25 August Jovan was appointed chief of the Internal Section of the Operative Division of the Main General Staff. He was then named chief of History and Archive Division of the Main General Staff on 27 March 1889, and remained on that duty until 10 February 1893 when he became commander of the Timok Division Area. On 2 September 1894, he was appointed chief of General Military Division of the Ministry of Defense. While he was on that duty, in the period 1894-1896, he was the editor of the Official Military Gazette. He was named assistant and acting chief of the Main General Staff on 18 March 1897. After that, on 1 February 1899, he was appointed commander of the Belgrade Fortress and he remained on that duty until 25 May that year. At the same time, he was appointed president of the Artillery Committee.

From 11 October 1897 he was minister of civil engineering in the Cabinet of Vladan Đorđević. He remained in that position until 22 January 1899, when he retired. He returned to that position on 25 May and remained there until he was appointed Minister of Defense in December that year. With the reconstruction of the Cabinet of Vladan Đorđević, after the death of Dragomir Vučković on 10 December 1899, he was named Minister of Defense until 12 July 1900. On 12 July 1900, he retired for the first time, but on 20 November 1902, he was reactivated and appointed infantry inspector of the Ministry of Defense. Seven days after this appointment, he also became a member of the Higher Military Council.

After the May Coup (Serbia) which was carried out on 29 May 1903, in the Cabinet of Jovan Avakumović, from 29 May 1903 until 12 July 1903, he was reappointed Minister of Defense. He was at the same duty in the Cabinet of Jovan Avakumović from 12 July until 2 August 1903, when he resigned. After he left the duty of the minister of defence, on 8 August, he was appointed Chancellor of Royal Decorations and he remained on that duty until 31 March 1906, when he was retired for the second time, this time upon his own request. During the war in 1912, as reserve general, he was mobilized and made a delegate of the Serbian Government with King Nikola Petrović and the Montenegrin Supreme Command. He remained a delegate until his return to Serbia in December 1913, when he was appointed Chancellor of Royal Decorations for the second time.

After he was released from this duty, on 1 April 1917, he went to Switzerland, where he established the Bureau for Prisoners of War. He was head of this organization until the end of 1918 when he turned over all the archival files to the International Federation of Red Cross, and he finally retired. Besides the mentioned wartime and peacetime appointments, he performed other duties as well. During the 1880s and 1890s on several occasions, he was a member of the Examination Commission for officers. In 1899, besides numerous other duties, he was also president of the Disability Tribunal.

Decorations

National
Order of the White Eagle of the 4th and 5th degree
Order of the Cross of Takovo with Swords of the 5th degree
Order of the Cross of Takovo of the 2nd degree
Silver Medal of Courage
Memorial for wars in 1876-78, 1885–86 and 1912–18

International

French
Legion of Honour of the 5th degree

Austrian
Order of Franz Joseph of the 3rd degree

References

1848 births
1921 deaths
20th-century Serbian people
Serbian military personnel of World War I
Serbian military personnel of the Balkan Wars
Serbian nationalists
People from Negotin
People from the Kingdom of Serbia
Burials at Belgrade New Cemetery
Defence ministers of Serbia
Construction ministers of Serbia